The 2015 Cary Challenger was a professional tennis tournament played on hard courts. It was the 1st edition of the tournament which was part of the 2015 ATP Challenger Tour. It took place in Cary, North Carolina, United States between 13 and 20 September 2015.

Singles main-draw entrants

Seeds

 1 Rankings are as of September 7, 2015

Other entrants
The following players received wildcards into the singles main draw:
  Nicolás Álvarez
  Ryan Harrison
  Robbie Mudge
  Brayden Schnur

The following players received entry from the qualifying draw:
  Damon Gooch
  Nicholas Horton
  Ronnie Schneider
  Wil Spencer

The following player received entry as a lucky loser:
  Keivon Tabrizi

The following players received entry as protected rankings:
  Dennis Nevolo
  Peter Polansky

Champions

Singles

 Dennis Novikov def.  Ryan Harrison 6–4, 7–5

Doubles

 Chase Buchanan /  Blaž Rola def.  Austin Krajicek /  Nicholas Monroe 6–4, 6–7{5–7}, [10–4]

References

External links
Official Website

Cary Challenger
Cary Challenger